The 2000 African Men's Handball Championship was the 14th edition of the African Men's Handball Championship, held in Algiers, Algeria, from 22 April to 1 May 2000. It acted as the African qualifying tournament for the 2001 World Championship in France.

Egypt finished first in the round robin tournament and wins its third African title. Algeria finished second and Tunisia third.

Qualified teams

Venues
Hacène Harcha Arena, Algiers
Omnisports Arena, Djasr Kasentina (Algiers)

Standings

Matches
All times are local (UTC+1).

References

African handball championships
Handball
A
Handball
Handball in Algeria
20th century in Algiers
April 2000 sports events in Africa
May 2000 sports events in Africa